Harmony River may refer to:
the Harmony River (Ontario) in Canada
a literal translation for the name of Đông Hà, Quảng Trị Province, Vietnam